Ahmet Delić (born 17 February 1986 in Priboj) is a Serbian-Austrian retired football player.

References 
 Player Profile at HLSZ
 

1986 births
Living people
People from Priboj
Bosniaks of Serbia
Austrian footballers
Serbian footballers
Association football midfielders
Austrian expatriate footballers
FC Admira Wacker Mödling players
Rot-Weiß Oberhausen players
SKN St. Pölten players
Zalaegerszegi TE players
Expatriate footballers in Germany
Expatriate footballers in Hungary
Austrian expatriate sportspeople in Germany
Austrian expatriate sportspeople in Hungary